
Gmina Brzeziny is a rural gmina (administrative district) in Kalisz County, Greater Poland Voivodeship, in west-central Poland.

Villages
Gmina Brzeziny contains the villages and settlements of Aleksandria, Brzeziny, Chudoba, Czempisz, Dzięcioły, Fajum, Jagodziniec, Jamnice, Moczalec, Ostrów Kaliski, Pieczyska, Piegonisko-Pustkowie, Piegonisko-Wieś, Przystajnia, Przystajnia-Kolonia, Rożenno, Sobiesęki, Wrząca, Zagórna and Zajączki.

Neighbouring gminas
Gmina Brzeziny is bordered by the gminas of Błaszki, Brąszewice, Czajków, Kraszewice, Sieroszewice and Szczytniki.

References
Polish official population figures 2006

Brzeziny
Gmina Brzeziny